The North Nyanza languages are a group of closely related Bantu languages spoken in Central and eastern Uganda.

History
The Proto-North Nyanza homeland was in the northwestern shores of Lake Victoria (Modern Buganda) in the year 700AD.

References

Bantu languages